Chionodes iridescens is a moth in the family Gelechiidae. It is found in North America, where it has been recorded from southern Yukon to Washington, the Northwest Territories and to Nova Scotia.

The larvae feed on Arctostaphylos uva-ursi.

References

Chionodes
Moths described in 1947
Moths of North America